Tom Masiko (born 17 February 1996) is an Ugandan international footballer who plays for Wakiso Giants, as a forward.

Career
He has played club football for Kampala Capital City Authority, Vipers and Wakiso Giants.

He made his international debut for Uganda in 2013.

References

1996 births
Living people
Ugandan footballers
Uganda international footballers
Kampala Capital City Authority FC players
Vipers SC players
Wakiso Giants FC players
Association football forwards